Iran (officially the Islamic Republic of Iran) competed at the 2016 Summer Olympics in Rio de Janeiro, from 5 to 21 August 2016. Since the nation's debut in 1948, Iranian athletes had attended in every Summer Olympic Games of the modern era, with the exception of the 1980 and 1984 Summer Olympics.

The National Olympic Committee of the Islamic Republic of Iran fielded a team of 63 athletes, 54 men and 9 women, across 15 sports at the Games. It was the nation's second-largest delegation sent to the Olympics, and featured Iran's highest female participation in history. Men's volleyball was the only team-based sport in which Iran was represented at the Games, the nation's Olympic debut. Wrestling accounted for the largest number of athletes by an individual-based sport with 12 entries; there was only a single competitor each in archery, boxing, flatwater canoeing, rowing, and swimming.

The Iranian roster featured a number of past Olympic medalists, including discus thrower Ehsan Haddadi, who won the nation's first ever athletics medal with a silver, and four defending champions from London: weightlifter Behdad Salimi, and Greco-Roman wrestlers Hamid Sourian, Omid Norouzi, and Ghasem Rezaei. Other notable Iranian athletes included table tennis player Noshad Alamian and his younger brother Nima in the men's singles, rifle shooter and London 2012 finalist Elaheh Ahmadi, and paraplegic archer Zahra Nemati, who significantly became the nation's first ever female athlete to earn an Olympic or Paralympic title four years earlier. Consequently, Nemati's story and sporting success prompted her to lead the Iranian delegation as the nation's third female flag bearer in Olympic history during the opening ceremony.

Iran left Rio de Janeiro with a total of 8 medals (3 gold, 1 silver, and 4 bronze), finishing twenty-fourth in the overall standings. Five of these medals were awarded to the team in wrestling, two in weightlifting, and one in taekwondo. Among the nation's medalists were taekwondo fighter Kimia Alizadeh, who became the first Iranian woman to stand on the podium by taking the bronze, and weightlifter Kianoush Rostami, who bested his runner-up feat from London, lifting a new world record for gold in the men's 85 kg category.

Medalists

Competitors

Archery

One Iranian archer qualified for the women's individual recurve by obtaining one of the three Olympic places available from the 2015 Asian Archery Championships in Bangkok, Thailand.

Athletics

Iranian athletes have so far achieved qualifying standards in the following athletics events (up to a maximum of 3 athletes in each event):

Track & road events

Field events

Boxing

Iran has entered one boxer to compete in the men's light heavyweight division into the Olympic boxing tournament. 2012 Olympian Ehsan Rouzbahani was the only Iranian finishing among the top two of his respective division in the AIBA Pro Boxing series.

Canoeing

Sprint
Iran has received a spare berth from the International Canoe Federation to enter a boat in the men's C-1 200 m to the Olympics, as the next highest-ranked nation, not yet qualified, at the 2015 Canoe Sprint World Championships, and as a response to the forfeiture of five boats held by the Russians due to their previous doping bans and their implications in the "disappearing positive methodology" set out in the McClaren Report on Russia's state-sponsored doping.

Qualification Legend: FA = Qualify to final (medal); FB = Qualify to final B (non-medal)

Cycling

Road
Iranian riders qualified for a maximum of three quota places in the men's Olympic road race by virtue of their top 4 national ranking in the 2015 UCI Asia Tour.

Fencing

Following the completion of the Grand Prix finals, Iran has entered two fencers into the Olympic competition. Sabre fencers Ali Pakdaman and 2012 Olympian Mojtaba Abedini had claimed their spots on the Iranian team by finishing among the top 14 individuals in the FIE Adjusted Official Rankings.

Judo

Iran has qualified three judokas for each of the following weight classes at the Games. London 2012 Olympian Javad Mahjoub was ranked among the top 22 eligible judokas for men in the IJF World Ranking List of May 30, 2016, while Alireza Khojasteh at men's half-lightweight (66 kg) earned a continental quota spot from the Asian region, as the highest-ranked Iranian judoka outside of direct qualifying position. Khojasteh subsequently withdrew from the Olympics before the opening ceremony due to health reasons.

Rowing

Iran has qualified one boat in the women's single sculls for the Olympics at the 2016 Asia & Oceania Continental Qualification Regatta in Chungju, South Korea.

Qualification Legend: FA=Final A (medal); FB=Final B (non-medal); FC=Final C (non-medal); FD=Final D (non-medal); FE=Final E (non-medal); FF=Final F (non-medal); SA/B=Semifinals A/B; SC/D=Semifinals C/D; SE/F=Semifinals E/F; QF=Quarterfinals; R=Repechage

Shooting

Iranian shooters have achieved quota places for the following events by virtue of their best finishes at the 2015 ISSF World Cup series, and Asian Championships, as long as they obtained a minimum qualifying score (MQS) by March 31, 2016.

Qualification Legend: Q = Qualify for the next round; q = Qualify for the bronze medal (shotgun)

Swimming

Iran has received an Universality invitation from FINA to send a male swimmer to the Olympics.

Table tennis

Iran has entered three athletes into the table tennis competition at the Games. Nima Alamian and 2012 Olympian Neda Shahsavari secured the Olympic spot each in the men's and women's singles as the highest-ranked table tennis player coming from the Middle Asia zone, while Nima's elder brother Noshad Alamian scored a second-stage victory to take the remaining spot on the Iranian team at the Asian Qualification Tournament in Hong Kong.

Taekwondo

Iran entered four athletes into the taekwondo competition at the Olympics. Farzan Ashourzadeh, Mehdi Khodabakhshi, and Sajjad Mardani qualified automatically for their respective weight classes by finishing in the top 6 WTF Olympic rankings. Meanwhile, Kimia Alizadeh was the only Iranian female finishing among the top two in the women's lightweight category (57 kg) at the 2016 Asian Qualification Tournament in Manila, Philippines.

Volleyball

Indoor

Men's tournament

Iran men's volleyball team qualified for the Olympics by picking up the continental spot as the highest-ranked Asian team at the first meet of the World Olympic Qualifying Tournament in Tokyo, Japan, signifying the nation's Olympic debut in the sport.

Team roster

Group play

Quarterfinal

Weightlifting

Iranian weightlifters have qualified five men's quota places for the Rio Olympics based on their combined team standing by points at the 2014 and 2015 IWF World Championships. The team must allocate these places to individual athletes by June 20, 2016.

Wrestling

Iran has qualified a total of twelve wrestlers for each the following weight classes into the Olympic competition. Majority of Olympic berths were awarded to Iranian wrestlers, who finished among the top six at the 2015 World Championships, while two other wrestlers progressed to the top two finals to book Olympic spots each in the men's freestyle 130 kg and men's Greco-Roman 66 kg at the 2016 Asian Qualification Tournament.

Two further wrestlers had claimed the remaining Olympic slots to round out the Iranian roster in separate World Qualification Tournaments; one of them in men's Greco Roman 120 kg at the initial meet in Ulaanbaatar, and the other in men's Greco-Roman 59 kg at the final meet in Istanbul.

Men's freestyle

Men's Greco-Roman

Referees and Officials 
Among the Iranian representatives in Rio 2016 Olympics, Alireza Faghani, Reza Sokhandan and Mohammadreza Mansouri were the Football referees, and Iman Farzin appointed as the only Iranian official in Press Operations for Badminton Games.

See also

Iran at the 2016 Summer Paralympics

References

External links 

 

Olympics
2016
Nations at the 2016 Summer Olympics